Millbrook railway station is a small station in the Millbrook area of Southampton, England. It is served mainly by the Salisbury to Romsey stopping service. This service runs once per hour in each direction.

The station is managed by South Western Railway. The platforms face the slow lines only, there are no platforms for the fast lines.

Millbrook Freightliner Terminal is located next to the station on the up side.  A car terminal and rail access to Southampton's Western Docks can be seen from the down side of the station.

In summer 2021, works were undertaken to improve the footbridge that connects the island platform with Millbrook Road West.

Services

1 train per hour (tph) to Salisbury via Romsey
1 tph to Romsey via Chandler's Ford 
One of these continues to Weymouth.

References

Railway stations in Southampton
DfT Category F2 stations
Railway stations in Great Britain opened in 1861
Former London and South Western Railway stations
Railway stations served by South Western Railway
1861 establishments in England